Khojian Ka Mohra is a town in the Islamabad Capital Territory of Pakistan. It is located at 33° 27' 45N 73° 16' 45E with an altitude of 568 metres (1866 feet respectively).

References 

Union councils of Islamabad Capital Territory